The Second Eastern Army of the Ottoman Empire (Turkish: İkinci Şark Ordusu) was one of the field armies of the Ottoman Army. It was formed during the initial phase of the First Balkan War. It confronted Bulgarian forces. It was formed from units of reorganized Eastern Army on October 29, 1912.

Order of battle

October 29, 1912 
On October 29, 1912, the army was structured as follows:

 Second Eastern Army HQ: Ferik Hamdi Pasha
III Corps (commanded by Mirliva Mahmud Muhtar Pasha)
VII Provisional Corps
VIII Provisional Corps

Sources 

Field armies of the Ottoman Empire
Military units and formations of the Ottoman Empire in the Balkan Wars